Genis-Vell is a superhero appearing in American comic books published by Marvel Comics. Created by Ron Marz and Ron Lim, the character first appeared in Silver Surfer vol. 3 Annual #6 (1993). He is depicted as the son of Mar-Vell of the extraterrestrial Kree Empire. The character has also been known as Legacy, Captain Marvel, and Photon at various points in his history.

Publication history
Genis-Vell first appeared in Silver Surfer vol. 3 Annual #6 (1993) using the codename of "Legacy." He appears in various Marvel titles in 1994 and 1995, primarily Silver Surfer and the Cosmic Powers miniseries. He starred in Captain Marvel vol. 3 by writer Fabian Nicieza and artist Ed Benes with an initial publication date of Dec. 1995. The series was abruptly canceled after only six issues; the unpublished issues #7-12 were later summarised by Nicieza in a fill-in issue (#14) of the next Captain Marvel (vol. 4) series in 2000.

Legacy appeared in Avengers Unplugged #5 (June 1996). After a single appearance in Silver Surfer later that year Genis-Vell would not appear for another two years, when he was included in a new Warlock title for four issues. An appearance in the Avengers Forever miniseries led to a second Captain Marvel series featuring Genis-Vell debuting in late 1999. The series would last for 35 issues, until October 2002.

In 2002 Marvel launched the U-Decide campaign in an attempt to bolster sales on several comics. Captain Marvel was canceled, with a new series relaunched with a new debut issue, with Peter David, continuing as writer, taking the book's storyline in a new direction. Captain Marvel vol. 5 was canceled with issue #25 in 2004 due to low sales.

Genis-Vell joined the Thunderbolts in issue #82 and was killed by Baron Helmut Zemo in issue #100 (May 2006).

Fictional character biography

Birth and early life
After the death of Mar-Vell (Captain Marvel), his lover Elysius decides to have a son. As one of the Eternals living on Titan, she uses the advanced technology of her race to impregnate herself with some of Mar-Vell's genetic material. Elysius seeks to protect her new son, Genis-Vell, from Mar-Vell's powerful enemies by taking him to a distant planet. There, she artificially ages him and implants false memories in his brain, making him believe that he had a natural childhood and that he is the son of Starfox.

Elysius like her son was created artificially. Elysius was created by the Titan computer ISAAC which had been corrupted by Thanos.

Avengers Forever (the Destiny War)

When the Destiny Force resurfaces in Rick Jones for a second time (the first time occurring during the Kree-Skrull War), it triggers a time-spanning conflict known as the Destiny War. A motley crew of Avengers are gathered. Among them is a future version of Genis, now known as Captain Marvel, eventually revealed to have been selected because of the role his interaction with Rick Jones would play in shaping the final outcome of the storyline. At the climax of the Destiny War and with Rick Jones' life in jeopardy, Genis recreates the Nega-Band connection with Rick in order to save him. After the war, Rick returns to the current day and the Genis of the present finds himself unwillingly bonded with Jones, a process which triggers his latent Cosmic Awareness.

Bonded
Rick and Genis spend a considerable time adventuring together, in an arrangement somewhat reminiscent of the one that existed between Genis' father, Mar-Vell, and Rick years before. During their time together, Mar-Vell and Rick exchanged places with each other between the regular universe and the Negative Zone and could hear each other's thoughts unaided.

Genis-Vell and Rick, however, alternate between the Microverse and the regular Marvel Universe and can not only hear each other's thoughts unaided but can also see each other in reflective surfaces or as red ghostly visions.

Whereas Mar-Vell and Rick formed a strong friendship during their time together, Genis-Vell and Rick have a much harder time getting along. Genis' alien (and immature) perspective make him unfathomable to Rick's jaded-sidekick sensibilities. Their ability to see and hear what the other is experiencing lead to awkward situations with Rick's wife, Marlo Chandler, and Genis' many amorous partners. Eventually, however, they become good friends.

Insanity
Genis' inability to control his Cosmic Awareness results in insanity. After a string of irrational adventures, Genis destroys the multiverse at the behest of Entropy and Epiphany. The multiverse is recreated with a Last Thursdayism effect on the universe's population, although with several alterations. No one remembers Genis' insanity, and he has an adult sister named Phyla-Vell. Although he swears to do good throughout the universe, a hallucination of Epiphany tells him that he is still insane.

Genis sets up an office for his superhero activities on Hyperion. Phyla arrives to mock his efforts, but they are interrupted when a future version of Marlo attacks them. Genis travels through time to find out why Marlo became a villain, and hopefully prevent it. Genis learns that his son Ely-Vell (who has not yet been born in Genis' timeline) is evil and plans to use both Marlo and Genis to trigger a near-universal extinction event. Unable to overcome his son in battle, Genis defeats Ely by choosing to kill him as an infant (an event still in his future), but faced with his infant son, he instead resolves to simply not have any children. By making the decision, his adult son fades away. Genis returns to the present, suffering great anguish from his choice.
 
Genis was separated from Rick by the cosmic entity Expediency.

Photon and the New Thunderbolts

Genis travels to Earth and joins MACH-IV's new team of Thunderbolts. During this time, he develops an interest in Songbird. The manipulations of the Purple Man cause Atlas to attack Genis in a rage, apparently killing him and throwing his body into the Hudson River. Though Genis would have recovered on his own, former Thunderbolt Baron Zemo uses a pair of alien moonstones to form a cocoon of energy, feeding him energy from the beginning and end of the universe to speed his recovery. When he emerges, he has absorbed the Nega-Bands into his body.

Genis' subsequent adoption of the name "Photon" causes him to quarrel with Monica Rambeau, who had also called herself "Photon" and "Captain Marvel." In the end, Genis is allowed to use the name "Photon" and Monica decides to use the codename "Pulsar".

However, Zemo realises that his mistake of siphoning energy from the beginning and end of time created a link between Genis and the universe that threatens to end existence. Zemo explores all future timelines with the moonstones, but fails to find a way to save both Genis and the universe: In every possible future timeline, Genis destroys the universe. Genis is aware of this, but keeps trying to tune his cosmic awareness in order to find a way to prevent this from happening. Finally, in a fight with Zemo, Genis is defeated. Zemo traps Genis in a moment in time. He then uses a combination of Blackout's Darkforce powers and the moonstones to separate Genis into individual pieces, trapping them in separate, far-off parts of the Darkforce Dimension so that they cannot be reunited.

Powers and abilities 
Genis-Vell possesses superhuman strength, durability, and speed, being able to exceed the speed of light. Due to his Titanian Eternal mother, Genis is far more powerful than his father, although he still needs the Nega-Bands to make full use of his abilities. His powers were also increased further when he merged with his future self, granting him the capability to kill all the troops of the Shi'ar/Kree/Skrull coalition present in the galaxy with a mere thought, by manipulating the electric energy in their minds.
He is capable of manipulating, project and absorb forms of energy such as magic, electric, photonic and atomic, but the full extent of his powers is unknown.
His energy projection is so vast that he was able to kill a multiversal incarnate of the cosmic entity Eternity (being that encompasses all the possible universes), destroying all of creation. He was even able to help Eternity's son Entropy in restarting the multiverse.

Initially, he only uses the Nega-Bands for flight, energy siphoning, energy blasts, and transportation to and from the Negative Zone. He is also able to augment his strength beyond 15 tons to the point where he was able to hurt the Maestro Hulk, King Hyperion or Drax the Destroyer and physically match the Sentry. After bonding with Rick, his latent multiversal Cosmic Awareness, inherited from his father, is activated. His link to another dimension is redirected from the Negative Zone to the Microverse. Genis-Vell was able to revive himself from death. He was also able to give the Punisher insight into his future which in turn had Castle in tears, and help King Thor discover the truth about the relationship of the Asgardians and the Ice Giants, making him uncover the lies spread by Odin. It is later revealed that he can exist in the past, present and future of multiple realities at the same time, this allows him to open portals to different timelines.

Originally, he can focus his cosmic awareness, allowing him to realize exactly what he needs to know at a particular time. When his powers grew, however, he is driven mad by the vast scope of his awareness, despite this he was an omniversal level telepath. While insane, he returns from the dead, raises Rick Jones from the dead, controls other dead bodies, creates holograms, empowers an alien serial killer, and survives a combined assault from multiple alien spacefleets.
He's also shown to be able to manipulate space and time at will, as well as create rifts in space and time, summon past versions of himself and others, teleport himself and others and travel through time.

After Zemo accidentally links him to other areas of time, Genis absorbs the Nega-Bands.

During the time of the events of House of M, his cosmic awareness could see through the fictitious reality created by Scarlet Witch, revealing the distorted nature of that universe, and as a result Genis inadvertently collapsed and expanded all of reality for a second.
Later, it is also revealed that Genis could bisect space, dividing everybody and everything in a range of 500 km into what is, was and could be.
By his conversation with Atlas we learn that he would have been able to undo the events of House of M, but was unwilling to due to his insecurities and his fear of making the wrong choice.

Photon's fellow Thunderbolt, Dr. Chen Lu, the Radioactive Man, theorises that Genis could control the photons of which everything is composed, implying large scale reality altering powers.

Reception

Accolades 

 In 2017, CBR.com ranked Genis-Vell 7th in their "16 Marvel Cosmic Beings Scarier Than Thanos" list.
 In 2018, CBR.com ranked Genis-Vell's Captain Marvel costume 5th in their "19 Captain Marvel Costumes" list.
 In 2019, CBR.com ranked Genis-Vell 7th in their "All The Captain Marvels" list.
 In 2020, CBR.com ranked Genis-Vell 6th in their "The Kree: The 10 Most Powerful Members Of The Race" list.
 In 2022, Screen Rant ranked Genis-Vell 8th in their "10 Best Cosmic Heroes Not Yet In The MCU" list, and included him in their "15 Most Powerful Versions Of Captain Marvel From The Comics" list, and in their "10 Best Captain Marvel Comics Characters Not In The MCU" list.
 In 2022, CBR.com ranked Genis-Vell 2nd in their "13 Strongest Members Of The Thunderbolts" list.

Literary reception

Volumes 
Evan Valentine of Comicbook.com gave Genis-Vell: Captain Marvel #1 a grade of 4.5 out of 5, writing, "Early in my comic book reading career, Peter David's Captain Marvel is a series that remained in my head for some time. David returns to the complicated relationship between Rick Jones and Genis-Vell alongside Juanan Ramirez and the new series doesn't miss a beat from the original run of this pair. Captain Marvel does a fantastic job of balancing the old school continuity with the modern events of the day, creating a fun ride for fans new and old. Even if you never got into the original series and have never read about Genis-Vell before, there's plenty here to love."

In other media

Video games
 Genis-Vell appears as a PSP exclusive character in Marvel: Ultimate Alliance, voiced by Roger Rose. Mar-Vell serves as an alternate costume.

Toys
 Toy Biz produced two Genis-Vell variants of the Marvel Select Captain Marvel action figure, one depicting him in Kree Armor and the other in his Captain Marvel costume.
 Bowen Designs produced a full size statue of Genis-Vell (as Captain Marvel): sculpted and designed by the Kucharek Brothers in December 2007 limited to 500 (Website Exclusive) Pieces and a mini-bust: sculpted by Randy Bowen in July 2002 limited to 3500 pieces. Prototype painted by John A Ficchi.
 Chaos War HeroClix

Collected editions

References

External links 
 Genis-Vell at the Comicbook Database
 MarvelDirectory.com's article on his father, and Genis' unnatural conception
 Captain Marvel Culture
 Legacy/Captain Marvel/Photon (Genis-Vell) Appearances in Publication Order
 

Captain Marvel (Marvel Comics)
Comics characters introduced in 1993
Fictional characters who can manipulate reality
Fictional characters who can manipulate light
Fictional characters who can manipulate time
Fictional characters with absorption or parasitic abilities
Fictional characters with energy-manipulation abilities
Fictional characters with precognition
Fictional characters with superhuman durability or invulnerability
Marvel Comics aliens
Marvel Comics characters who can move at superhuman speeds
Marvel Comics characters who can teleport
Marvel Comics characters with superhuman strength
Marvel Comics extraterrestrial superheroes
Marvel Comics hybrids
Marvel Comics telepaths
Kree
Eternals (comics)
Characters created by Ron Marz
Characters created by Ron Lim
Marvel Comics supervillains